Anil Nedumangad (also known as P. Anil; 30 May 1972 – 25 December 2020) was an Indian actor who appeared in Malayalam films.

Acting career 
He made his debut in Thaskaraveeran with an uncredited appearance. His breakthrough was in the 2014 film Njan Steve Lopez, directed by Rajeev Ravi. Other movies where he played important roles were Ayyappanum Koshiyum, Kammatipaadam, Kismath, Paavada and Porinju Mariam Jose. He appeared in a 2021 film Cold Case.

Early life 
Anil was born in Nedumangad, Trivandrum as the son of C. Peethambharan Nair, a retired teacher, and Rajamma. He had an elder brother, Anand, an ayurvedic doctor. He studied in Mancha School, Nedumangad and pursued BA Malayalam course at Mahatma Gandhi College, Trivandrum and then went to School of Drama, Thrissur. He started his career as a TV anchor and program producer for TV Channels Kairali TV, Asianet, JaiHind TV, Reporter TV and Kairali News.

Death 
Anil died from drowning at Malankara Dam while swimming with friends during a break of the film Peace on 25 December 2020, aged just 48. He re-entered the dam for bathing after already having a bath, and was trapped in an undercurrent. After long search his friends could not find him and had to sought the help of Kerala Fire Force and local people. Though he was taken to the nearby hospital, his life could not be saved. Locals say that it is difficult to swim in Malankara Dam, even for extremely good swimmers.

Filmography

 All films are in Malayalam language unless otherwise noted.

References

External links
 

1972 births
2020 deaths
Male actors from Kerala
Male actors from Thiruvananthapuram
Deaths by drowning in India
Indian male film actors
Male actors in Malayalam cinema
21st-century Indian male actors
Accidental deaths in India